Reed Windmill may refer to a number of windmills in England.

In Hertfordshire
Any of three windmills at Reed, including Mile End Farm Mill which has been truncated and converted to residential accommodation.

In Kent
Reed Mill, Kingston, which survives as an empty tower.